Emin Jafarov (born 12 October 1979) is an Azerbaijani sport shooter. He competed in the 2020 Summer Olympics.

References

1979 births
Living people
Sportspeople from Baku
Shooters at the 2020 Summer Olympics
Azerbaijani male sport shooters
Olympic shooters of Azerbaijan
21st-century Azerbaijani people